IC 1953 is a barred spiral galaxy situated in the constellation of Eridanus. Located about 86 million light years away, it is a member of the Eridanus cluster of galaxies, a cluster of about 200 galaxies. It was discovered by DeLisle Stewart in 1899.

IC 1953 has a Hubble classification of SBc, which indicates it is a barred spiral galaxy. It is moving away from the Milky Way at a rate of 1,867 km/s. Its size on the night sky is 2.9' x 2.1' which is proportional to its real size of 72 000 ly.

References 

Eridanus (constellation)
Barred spiral galaxies
1953